Hell Is What You Make It is the third studio album by electronic rock duo Breathe Carolina. It was released on July 12, 2011 through Fearless Records. Recording for the album took place in Los Angeles, California between 2010-2011 whilst production was handled by Ian Kirkpatrick. Musically, the album is mainly rooted in dance, pop, trance and post-hardcore genres but also uses elements of electronic music and dubstep. The album received generally positive reviews from music critics, who commended its "catchiness" and "radio-friendly" songs. It debuted at number 42 on the Billboard 200, as well as the top 10 of the Dance/Electronic, Rock, Alternative and Independent Albums charts. Promotion of the album was primarily through live concerts and television performances, such as Jimmy Kimmel Live! and The Daily Habit. Its lead single, "Blackout", has since become a commercial success, peaking within the charts in Canada, New Zealand, Scotland, the United Kingdom and United States, while being certified Platinum by the Recording Industry Association of America (RIAA) for selling more than 1 million copies. A deluxe edition titled Hell Is What You Make It: RELOADED was scheduled to be released on July 10, 2012, including two new original tracks, one remix, and a new version of "Last Night (Vegas)". It is their final release with founding member Kyle Even.

Background and recording 
On December 22, 2010, Fearless Records posted a video featuring a 30-second preview of the track "Blackout". Recording took place in Los Angeles, California in early 2011. It is the first album in which Breathe Carolina recorded as a full band. It was officially announced on April 28, 2011 when the band launched a website to promote the album. The website contained a video featuring a forty-second preview of the track "Wooly" whilst displaying the album's title and release date in flash animation. On May 15, 2011, a demo of the track "Sweat It Out" was temporarily posted on YouTube before being shortly taken down. On May 19, the promotional website was updated, containing the album's cover art and track listing.

Release and promotion 
The album was released on July 12, 2011 through Fearless Records. The duo participated in the 2011 Scream It Like You Mean It Tour to promote the album. The group embarked on a co-headlining tour called the Blackout Forever Tour in 2012 with the Ready Set.

Prior to the album's release, "Wooly" and "Sweat It Out" were available for streaming on the duo's official social networking sites.

Singles 
The album's lead single, "Blackout", was available for streaming via MTV Buzzworthy on June 13, 2011, and was released for digital download the following day. It has since become the duo's most commercially successful single to date, charting within Canada, New Zealand, Scotland, the United Kingdom and United States, while also being certified Gold by the Recording Industry Association of America (RIAA) for selling more than 500,000 copies. It has also received generally favorable reviews from music critics, with Alternative Press calling it an "irresistible synth-pop song". A lyric video was uploaded onto the duo's official YouTube account on June 24. An accompanying music video was released onto the duo's official Vevo page on YouTube on September 20, and has since garnered more than 1 million views. The video features shots of the duo partying and getting into trouble, as well as performing the song at a live event. It was shot during summer 2011 in Los Angeles, California. The duo also performed the song live on Jimmy Kimmel Live! in their first televised performance ever. An extended play titled Blackout: The Remixes EP was released on September 27 via iTunes. "Hit and Run" exclusively premiered via Alternative Press on May 21, 2012, while being available for digital download the following day. It is featured on the deluxe edition of the album.

Critical reception 

The album has received generally positive reviews from music critics. Tim Sendra of Allmusic gave a positive review, scoring the album 3 and a half stars out of 5, saying, "Hell Is What You Make It finds the duo of Kyle Even and David Schmitt refining their amalgamation of sounds into something both slicker and more powerful than past efforts". The album's singles, "Blackout", "Last Night (Vegas)", and "Take It Back" were indicated as the AMG Track Picks. Alternative Press also gave a positive review, scoring the album 3 and a half stars out of 5, saying, "The band—and producer Ian Kirkpatrick—bring a lot of dishes to this sonic buffet—and most of them are to be consumed on the dancefloor". While praising "Blackout", an "irresistible synth-pop song", "Wooly", the opening track "where house-techno sequencers and melodic vocals parry with screamo-metal breakdowns and growling", and "Waiting", "the head-nod initiator" that "would sound sweet bumping at a hipster club at 4 a.m," they criticized the tracks "Last Night (Vegas)", "Take It Back", and "Chemicals", calling them a "smack of blatant careerism". Jon Caramanica of The New York Times calls the album, "one of the year's best pure pop albums." He states, "Rivulets of teen pop, pop-punk, screamo and club music all feed these songs, which are propulsive and cheerful even when the subject matter is grim."

Commercial performance 
It debuted and peaked at number 42 on the Billboard 200, only one number higher than their previous album, Hello Fascination. It also charted within the Billboard Rock, Alternative, Dance and Independent Album Charts. As of March 2014, the album has sold 64,000 copies in the United States.

Track listing
All songs produced by Ian Kirkpatrick except "Chemicals", produced by Matt Squire.

Personnel
Breathe Carolina
Kyle Even – unclean vocals, clean vocals
David Schmitt – clean vocals, keyboards, guitars, bass, drums
Additional musicians
Eric Armenta – drums, percussion
Joshua Aragon – keyboards, guitars, background vocals
Luis Bonet – keyboards

Production
Matt Squire – production, engineering, mixing
Ian Kirkpatrick – programming, production, engineering, mixing
Carlos De Garza – drum engineering
Sol Amstutz – artwork
Shervon Esfahani – A&R
Chris Foitle – A&R

Charts

References

2011 albums
Breathe Carolina albums
Fearless Records albums
Albums produced by Matt Squire